The knockout stage of the 2006–07 UEFA Cup began on 14 February 2007, culminating with the final at Hampden Park, Glasgow, on 16 May 2007. The knockout stage included the top three teams from each group in the previous stage and the third-placed teams from the 2006–07 UEFA Champions League group stage.

Each knockout round tie consisted of two-legged matches, home and away, in which the team with the higher aggregate score progressed to the next round, with the exception of the final, which was played over just one match at a neutral venue. In the event that the two teams' aggregate scores were tied, the team that scored more goals in their away leg would progress to the next round.

Bracket

Round of 32
On 7 February, the Italian government ruled Parma and Livorno's home fields did not meet safety requirements following riots that occurred after a Serie A match in Sicily. Both sides played their home legs behind closed doors.

On 19 January, UEFA declared that Feyenoord had been removed after crowd misbehaviour in their final group stage match against Nancy; UEFA announced on 25 January that their scheduled opponents, Tottenham Hotspur, had received a bye. Feyenoord unsuccessfully appealed the decision.

First leg
All times CET

Second leg
All times CET

AZ won on away goals. The aggregate score was 5–5.

Maccabi Haifa won 1–0 on aggregate.

Bayer Leverkusen won 3–2 on aggregate.

Shakhtar Donetsk won 2–1 on aggregate.

Benfica won 3–1 on aggregate.

Celta Vigo won 3–2 on aggregate.

Newcastle United won 4–1 on aggregate.

Osasuna won 1–0 on aggregate.

Lens won 3–1 on aggregate.

Paris Saint-Germain won 4–0 on aggregate.

Braga won 2–0 on aggregate.

Sevilla won 3–0 on aggregate.

Werder Bremen won 4–3 on aggregate.

Rangers won 5–2 on aggregate.

Espanyol won 4–1 on aggregate.

Bye: Tottenham Hotspur

Notes
Note 1: Maccabi Haifa played their home matches at Bloomfield Stadium in Tel Aviv instead of their regular stadium, Kiryat Eliezer Stadium, Haifa.

Round of 16
The first legs were played on 8 March 2007, while the second legs were played on 14  and 15 March 2007.

First leg
All times CET

Second leg
All times CET

Bayer Leverkusen won 4–2 on aggregate.

Osasuna won 2–1 on aggregate.

Werder Bremen won 3–0 on aggregate.

Tottenham Hotspur won 6–4 on aggregate.

Sevilla won 5–4 on aggregate.

AZ won on away goals. The aggregate score was 4–4.

Espanyol won 4–0 on aggregate.

Benfica won 4–3 on aggregate.

Notes
Note 1: Maccabi Haifa played their home matches at Bloomfield Stadium in Tel Aviv instead of their regular stadium, Kiryat Eliezer Stadium, Haifa.

Quarter-finals

First leg
All times CET

Second leg
All times CET

Espanyol won 3–2 on aggregate.

Osasuna won 4–0 on aggregate.

Sevilla won 4–3 on aggregate.

Werder Bremen won 4–1 on aggregate.

Semi-finals

First leg
All times CET

Second leg
All times CET

Sevilla won 2–1 on aggregate.

Espanyol won 5–1 on aggregate.

Final

Knockout stage
2006